The Americas Netball World Cup Qualifiers are scheduled to be held in Jamaica between 16 October and 21 October 2022. There will be nine teams taking part, two of which will qualify for the 2023 Netball World Cup (although one participating team, Jamaica, have already qualified based on World Netball Rankings).

The tournament will be played in round-robin format.

Standings

Matches

References 

World Cup
Netball
Netball
Americas
International netball competitions hosted by Jamaica
Netball